The Prince Creek Formation is a geological formation in Alaska with strata dating to the Early Maastrichtian stage of the Late Cretaceous. Dinosaur remains are among the fossils that have been recovered from the formation.

Age 
The Prince Creek Formation aged from 80 to 61.7 million years ago. The Kikak-Tegoseak Quarry, where almost all of the dinosaur fossil are from, is located near the middle of the formation, and is about 70.6 to 69.1 million years ago. A lower section, the Kogosukruk Tongue, ages from 72 to 71 million years ago, in the latest Campanian. The youngest part of the formation is Ocean Point, which extends into the Paleogene, at the end of the Danian, based on the age of ostracods and mollusks. In the middle of the formation is the Coleville River Bluff, which extends from the Late Campanian to the Middle/Late Maastrichtian, in which pollen spores are common. However, a recent study dated all of the Prince Creek to the Early Maastrichtian.

Habitat 
 
During the time when the Prince Creek Formation was deposited, Earth was going through a greenhouse phase. The rocks in it are alluvial, and were, at the time of burial, on a muddy coastal plain. Leafy plants, roots and pollen are known from the formation, and they show that trampling by dinosaurs was common. It can be proven that during the Maastrichtian the Prince Creek Formation bordered a large body of water by the presence of gypsum and pyrite in nearby rock. Large amounts of plants material are represented by peridonoid dinocysts, algae, fungal hyphae, fern and moss spores, projectates, Wodehouseia edmontonicola, hinterland bisaccate pollen, and pollen from trees, shrubs, and herbs. Concluded on the large amounts of dinosaurs and flora, the Prince Creek Formation was likely a polar woodland lacking ground ice with dinosaurs dominating and angiosperms towering above them. Mean annual precipitation was /year. The paleolatitude of the formation at the time of deposition was around 80°–85°N, high in the Arctic Circle, and would have likely experienced 120 days of winter darkness.

Vertebrate paleofauna

Dinosaurs

Theropods 
Indeterminate tyrannosaurid remains are present, mostly in the form of teeth. The teeth are from the Kikak-Tegoseak Quarry, Liscomb Quarry, and Byers Bed, totaling 8 teeth.

Ornithischians

Mammals

Plants

See also 
 List of dinosaur-bearing rock formations

References

Bibliography 
 
 
 
 Weishampel, David B.; Dodson, Peter; and Osmólska, Halszka (eds.): The Dinosauria, 2nd, Berkeley: University of California Press. 861 pp. .

Geologic formations of Alaska
Cretaceous Alaska
Campanian Stage
Maastrichtian Stage of North America
Cretaceous–Paleogene boundary
Paleogene Alaska
Danian Stage
Sandstone formations of the United States
Mudstone formations
Deltaic deposits
Fluvial deposits
Fossiliferous stratigraphic units of North America
Paleontology in Alaska